Pembrey and Burry Port railway station is a railway station on the West Wales line serving Pembrey and Burry Port, in Carmarthenshire, Wales. It is adjacent to Burry Port's main shopping area.

History

It was opened  by the broad gauge South Wales Railway on 11 October 1852 when that company extended its route from Landore (Swansea) to Carmarthen.

The South Wales Railway amalgamated with the Great Western Railway in 1863 and the broad gauge was replaced by standard gauge in 1872.

Train movements are controlled from a Great Western Railway signal box opened in 1907.

In 2012, Network Rail had threatened to remove the Victorian bridge due to its poor state of repair. However, a local campaign to save the bridge was successful. In January 2020, the footbridge was removed to be refurbished. It was strengthened, decorated and had a new decking added, before being reinstalled. It followed work in 2013 to add lighting to the bridge.

Train services
There is an hourly service to Manchester Piccadilly via Swansea, Cardiff Central, Shrewsbury and Crewe.  A similar frequency operates on Sundays, but trains do not start running until late morning.

In the other direction there is an hourly service to Carmarthen, running either non-stop or stopping at Kidwelly and Ferryside, with a two-hourly extension to Milford Haven via Whitland and Haverfordwest.

All of these services are operated by Transport for Wales.

Great Western Railway operate one daily service between Carmarthen and London Paddington (to London in the morning & back in the evening Mon-Sat). This saves having to travel to Swansea and change trains. On summer Saturdays an extra service runs through to Pembroke Dock. This service departs London Paddington at 08:45 and arrives at Pembroke Dock at 14:14.  On Sundays, a more frequent service operates (three trains each way from early afternoon).

References

External links

Railway stations in Llanelli
DfT Category F1 stations
Former Great Western Railway stations
Railway stations in Great Britain opened in 1852
Railway stations served by Great Western Railway
Railway stations served by Transport for Wales Rail
1852 establishments in Wales
Burry Port